Zieria eungellaensis is a plant in the citrus family Rutaceae and is only found on a few isolated mountains in Queensland. It is a compact but open shrub with wiry branches, three-part leaves and flowers in small groups, each flower white or pink with four petals and four stamens, and is endemic to the Eungella National Park.

Description
Only the midvein is distinct on the lower surface and unlike some other zierias, the leaf surface is not obviously warty.

Taxonomy and naming
Zieria eungellaensis was first formally described in 2007 by Marco Duretto and Paul Forster from a specimen collected on Mount William in the Eungella National Park. The description was published in Austrobaileya. The specific epithet (eungellaensis) is a reference to the range of this species in the Eungella National Park.

Distribution and habitat
This zieria grows in rock crevices surrounded by dense, heathy vegetation on mountain summits in the Eungella National Park. Plants have been seen on Mount William, Mount David and Mount Dalrymple.

Conservation
Zieria eungellaensis is listed as "least concern" under the Queensland Nature Conservation Act 1992.

References

eungellaensis
Sapindales of Australia
Flora of Queensland
Taxa named by Marco Duretto
Plants described in 2007
Taxa named by Paul Irwin Forster